Cyclophorus speciosus is a species of gastropods belonging to the family Cyclophoridae.

The species is found in India and Southeastern Asia.

References

Cyclophoridae
Gastropods described in 1847
Gastropods of Asia